The 2013 Chrono Gatineau was a one-day women's cycle  race held in Canada on May 20 2013. The tour has an UCI rating of 1.1.

References

2013 in women's road cycling
Chrono Gatineau